The 1984–85 Villanova Wildcats men's basketball team represented Villanova University. The head coach was Rollie Massimino. The team played its home games at Villanova Field House in Villanova, Pennsylvania, and was a member of the Big East Conference.  The team is famous for one of the biggest upsets in sports history – a 66–64 win over #1 Georgetown in the NCAA Tournament final on April 1, 1985.

Roster

Schedule

|-
!colspan=9 style="background:#013974; color:#67CAF1;"| Non-Conference Regular Season

|-
!colspan=9 style="background:#013974; color:#67CAF1;"| Big East Conference Regular Season

|-
!colspan=9 style="background:#013974; color:#67CAF1;"| Non-Conference Regular Season

|-
!colspan=9 style="background:#013974; color:#67CAF1;"| Big East Conference Regular Season

|-
!colspan=9 style="background:#013974; color:#67CAF1;"| Non-Conference Regular Season

|-
!colspan=9 style="background:#013974; color:#67CAF1;"| Big East Conference Regular Season

|-
!colspan=9 style="background:#013974; color:#67CAF1;"| Non-Conference Regular Season

|-
!colspan=9 style="background:#013974; color:#67CAF1;"| Big East Conference Regular Season

|-
!colspan=9 style="background:#013974; color:#67CAF1;"| Big East tournament

|-
!colspan=9 style="background:#013974; color:#67CAF1;"| NCAA Tournament

Awards and honors
 Ed Pinckney, Final Four Most Outstanding Player
 Ed Pinckney, Philadelphia Big 5 Player of the Year
 Ed Pinckney, 1st Team All-Big East
 Ed Pinckney, Big East All-Tournament Team
 Dwayne McClain, 3rd Team All-Big East
 Dwayne McClain, All-Big 5
 Dwayne McClain, Final Four All-Tournament Team
 Gary McLain, Final Four All-Tournament Team
 Harold Jensen, Final Four All-Tournament Team

Team players drafted into the NBA

Legacy
In 2013, author Frank Fitzpatrick released his book The Perfect Game: How Villanova’s Shocking 1985 Upset of Mighty Georgetown Changed the Landscape of College Hoops Forever focusing on the team's victorious season.

References

Villanova
Villanova
Villanova Wildcats men's basketball seasons
NCAA Division I men's basketball tournament championship seasons
NCAA Division I men's basketball tournament Final Four seasons
1985 in sports in Pennsylvania
1984 in sports in Pennsylvania